René Queyroux (22 December 1927 – 10 August 2002) was a French fencer. He won a bronze medal in the team épée event at the 1956 Summer Olympics.

References

External links
 

1927 births
2002 deaths
French male épée fencers
Olympic fencers of France
Fencers at the 1956 Summer Olympics
Olympic bronze medalists for France
Olympic medalists in fencing
Medalists at the 1956 Summer Olympics